The North Winnipeg Nomads Football Club is a Canadian football club established in 1969 and originally started as a single bantam age (15-year-olds) football team.  Eventually, the club grew to include teams from ages 7 to 21.  The Nomads has the second largest enrolment in Canadian amateur football.

History
The Nomads were the first Winnipeg team to win the Western Canadian Bantam Football
Championship since its inception in 1967.

The club has won 23 Manitoba provincial championship titles plus two interprovincial titles.

A minor bantam (14-year-olds) team was added in 1978.

The club moved to the former Winnipeg Hawkeyes field and clubhouse in 1997.

In 2002, after the Manitoba Lotteries Corp. backed away from plans to purchase the field and relocate the club, the Nomads Board began fundraising for much needed field improvements. Their successful efforts from 2002 - 2004, resulted in installation of the field lighting, automated sprinkler system, improved seating, and the perimeter fence.

This period also saw the Nomads grow from just under 200 players to 330 by 2004.

In 2011, the Nomads club welcomed the North Winnipeg Nomads Wolf Pack, a senior women's tackle football team (ages 16+) that competes in the Western Women's Canadian Football League that spans three prairie provinces.

The Nomads have competed against teams from and around Winnipeg, including the East Side Eagles, the  Transcona Nationals, the  St. Boniface Warriors, the Ft. Garry Lions, the St. Vital Mustangs, the St. James Rods, the Lockport Cowboys, the Greendell Falcons, Eastman Raiders and Valour Patriots.

Championships by Year

1970s
1970 Bantam Provincial and Western Canadian Champions
1972 Bantam Provincial and Western Canadian Champions
1973 Bantam Provincial and Western Canadian Champions
1974 Bantam Provincial Champions
1979 Minor Bantam Provincial Champions

1980s
1980 Minor Bantam Provincial Champions
1981 Bantam Provincial Champions

1990s
1990 Bantam Provincial Champions
1993 Minor Bantam Provincial Champions
1994 Bantam Champions
1995 Peewee Champions

2000s
2002 Midget Provincial Champions
2005 Bantam Provincial Champions
2006 Midget Provincial Champions
2008 
Atom Provincial  Champions (Nomads Atom North Team)
Peewee Provincial Champions
Major Provincial Champions
2009 
Minor Bantam Provincial Champions
Major Provincial Champions

2010s
2010 Midget Provincial Champions
2011 Bantam Provincial Champions
2012 
Pee Wee Provincial Champions
Midget Provincial Champions
2013 
Junior Girls Manitoba Champions
Bantam Provincial Champions
2017
Atom A Championship
Bantam A Championship

Championships by League
Bantam Western Canadian Championships
1970, 1972, 1973
Bantam Provincial Championships
1970, 1972, 1973, 1974, 1981, 1990, 1994, 2005, 2011, 2013, 2017
Junior Manitoba Girls Championships
2013
Major Provincial Championships
2008, 2009
Midget Provincial Championships
2002, 2006, 2010, 2012
Minor Bantam Provincial Championships
1979, 1980, 1993
Peewee Provincial Championships
1995, 2012
Atom Provincial Championships
2017

CFL Alumni
Jason Dzikowicz played for the Winnipeg Blue Bombers
Harold Jackman played for the Ottawa Rough Riders
Kurt Goodrich played for the Winnipeg Blue Bombers
Rick Koswin played for the Winnipeg Blue Bombers
Mark McLoughlin played Minor Bantam in 1979 and Bantam in 1980.  He was the kicker for the Calgary Stampeders starting in 1988, when he was drafted as Calgary's third round draft choice (20th overall) in the CFL Canadian College Draft.
Mike O'Donnell played for the Montreal Alouettes
Gary Rosolowich played for the Winnipeg Blue Bombers
Eddie Steele plays for the Edmonton Eskimos

NHL Alumni
Colton Orr – Boston Bruins, New York Rangers and Toronto Maple Leafs
Travis Zajac – New Jersey Devils

References

External links
Governing Body
Football Manitoba
Leagues
Manitoba Major Football League
Midget Football League of Manitoba
Western Women Canadian Football League
Teams
Charleswood Broncos
Crescentwood Grizzlies
Eastman Raiders
Ft. Garry Lions
Falcons Football Club
Lightning
Nomads Wolf Pack
North Winnipeg Nomads
Portage Pitbulls
St. James Rods
St. Vital Mustangs
Transcona Nationals

Sports clubs established in 1969
Canadian football teams in Winnipeg
1969 establishments in Manitoba